Célia Regina Cruz, better known as Célia (September 8, 1947   September 29, 2017), was a Brazilian singer.

Career 
Célia began her musical career on the TV show Um Instante, Maestro! in 1970, debuting her self-titled album, which was produced with Discos Continental. It featured songs from songwriters like Joyce, Lô Borges, Ivan Lins, Nelson Angelo, and Rogério Duprat. Her second album, released in 1972, which was also self-titled, featured songs written by Marcos Valle, Erasmo Carlos, and Tom Jobim. Both albums were arranged by Arthur Verocai. At this time, she appeared on his self-titled album on the track "Seriado".

Célia performed in Italy, France, Brazil, and other countries in Latin America. At one point, Célia performed in Monaco for Prine Rainier III. She also hosted the TV show Qual é a Música? for some time.

Célia's greatest success in Brazil was for her cover of "Onde Estão Os Tamborins?", or "Where Are The Tamborins?" in English, which was released as a single in 1975. She was also well known for her cover of "Adeus Batucada," or "Farewell Batucada" in English.

Since album repressings by Mr Bongo and Warner Music and the sampling of her recording "David" in "Opaul" by rapper Freddie Dredd, Célia has seen a resurgence of popularity, particularly among younger generations.

Death 
Célia died in 2017 due to lung cancer, after being hospitalized for a month.

Discography

Albums 

 Célia (1970)
 Célia (1972)
 Célia (1975)
 Célia (1977)
 Amor (1982)
 Meu Caro (1983)
 Louca De Saudade (1993)
 Pra Fugir Da Saudade – Canções De Paulinho Da Viola (2000)
 Faço No Tempo Soar Minha Sílaba (2007)
 O Lado Oculto Das Canções – Célia 40 Anos (2010)
 Aquilo Que A Gente Diz (2015)

Singles 

 Adeus Batucada / Blues (1970)
 Nasci Numa Manhã De Carnaval / Sem Palavras (1971)
 A Hora É Essa / Na Boca Do Sol (1972)
 Badalação (Bahia, Volume 2) / Detalhes (1972)
 Detalhes / Em Familia (1973)
 Ponto De Encontro / É Tempo De Matar Saudade (1973)
 Azucri / Tatuagem (1974)
 Onde Estão Os Tamborins / Pomba Branca (1975)
 Guarânia Guarani / Fogo, Por Favor (1981)
 Brasil Canta Na Itália (1984)
 A Hora é Essa / Ei, Você, Psiu! (2016)
 Zózoio Como É Que É / Para Lennon E McCartney (2017)
 Dominus Tecum / Vida De Artista (unknown)
 Badalação (Bahia Vol. 2) / Dez Bilhões De Neurônios (unknown)

EPs 

 No Clarão Da Lua Cheia (1971)
 O Rei Que Não Sabia De Nada (1982)

Compilations 

 15 Anos (1986)
 Célia (2011)
 Outros Românticos (2012)

References 

Deaths from lung cancer in Brazil
2017 deaths
1947 births
Brazilian soul singers
Brazilian funk singers
Brazilian women singers
People from São Paulo
Women in Latin music